Jahangir Shamz (born Shamsudeen Jahangir 1969 in Varkala, Kerala) is an Indian director and producer who works in Malayalam films.

Biography 

Jahangir Shamz started his career as an engineer in 1995. He did a Diploma in Film Making from New York Film Academy (Abu Dhabi).

Jahangir produced a Malayalam feature film in 2009, Madhya Venal, which was directed by Madhu Kaithapram. He produced another feature film in 2011, Bhakthajanangalude Sradhakku directed by Priyanandanan.

In 2013, Jahangir directed his first film, Teens.  His next film Karanavar  which came out in 2014 was produced by Sandya Rajendran under the banner of Kalidasa International.

Filmography

As producer

As director

References

External links

Malayalam film directors
Malayalam film producers
People from Varkala
Film producers from Thiruvananthapuram
Living people
1969 births
Film directors from Thiruvananthapuram